Sacha Cosmetics a Trinidad and Tobago-based cosmetics manufacturer. Founded in 1979, Sacha cosmetics is distributed in 23 countries.

References

Cosmetics companies of Trinidad and Tobago
Brands of Trinidad and Tobago